Ralph Waite (June 22, 1928 – February 13, 2014) was an American actor, best known for his lead role as John Walton Sr. on The Waltons (1972–1981), which he occasionally directed. He also had recurring roles in NCIS as Jackson Gibbs, the father of Leroy Jethro Gibbs, and Bones, as Seeley Booth's grandfather.  Waite had supporting roles in movies such as Cool Hand Luke (1967), Five Easy Pieces (1970), The Grissom Gang (1971), The Bodyguard (1992), and Cliffhanger (1993).

Early life
Waite, the eldest of five children, was born in White Plains, New York, on June 22, 1928, to Ralph H. Waite, a construction engineer, and Esther (née Mitchell) Waite. He graduated from White Plains Senior High School in 1946. Too young for World War II, Waite served in the U.S. Marine Corps from 1946 to 1948, then graduated from Bucknell University in Lewisburg, Pennsylvania. He worked briefly as a social worker. Waite earned a master's degree from Yale University's  Divinity School and was an ordained Presbyterian minister and religious editor at Harper & Row, New York, before deciding on an acting career. He was a member of the Peninsula Players summer theater program during the 1963 season.

In 1963, Waite made his Broadway debut as the Minister in Marathon '33, written and directed by June Havoc.  He next appeared in Blues for Mister Charlie, and worked on- and off-Broadway steadily throughout the 1960s.

Film work

His film work included roles in Cool Hand Luke, Five Easy Pieces, Lawman, Kid Blue, The Grissom Gang, Chato's Land, and The Stone Killer. His later films included The Bodyguard, the part of Frank the helicopter pilot in the 1993 film Cliffhanger, and as the mysterious time traveler in Timequest (2002). He also voiced Shadow in Homeward Bound II.

Later stage work
Waite scored a personal triumph when he created the role of Will Kidder in the Pulitzer Prize-winning The Young Man from Atlanta, by playwright Horton Foote, in 1995.

Personal life
Waite was married three times, two marriages ending in divorce. He had three daughters from his first marriage. His eldest daughter, Sharon Waite, died of leukemia when she was 9 years old in 1964. Liam Waite, one of Waite's stepsons, is also an actor. After 50 years away from organized religion, Waite returned in 2010 and became an active member of Spirit of the Desert Presbyterian Fellowship in Palm Desert, California.

Political involvement
Waite ran unsuccessfully for Congress in California as a Democrat on three occasions: In 1990, he challenged veteran GOP incumbent Al McCandless in the Riverside County-based 37th district, losing by 5%. In 1998, Waite ran in the special election for the then-Palm Springs-based 44th district left vacant by the death of incumbent Sonny Bono. He was defeated in that election by Mary Bono, Sonny's widow, and lost to her again that November.

On October 21, 1991, Waite introduced former California Governor Jerry Brown prior to the latter's speech announcing his candidacy for the 1992 Democratic presidential nomination.

Electoral history

Death
On February 13, 2014, Waite died in Palm Desert, California, of natural causes at age 85. He is buried in White Plains Rural Cemetery in New York.

Filmography

Film
 1967 Cool Hand Luke as "Alibi"
 1968 A Lovely Way to Die as Sean Magruder
 1969 Last Summer as Peter's Father (uncredited)
 1970 Five Easy Pieces as Carl Fidelio Dupea
 1971 The Pursuit of Happiness as Detective Cromie
 1971 The Sporting Club as Olson
 1971 Lawman as Jack Dekker
 1971 The Grissom Gang as Mace
 1972 Chato's Land as Elias Hooker
 1972 Hot Summer Week as John
 1972 The Magnificent Seven Ride! as Jim MacKay
 1973 Trouble Man as Pete Cockrell
 1973 Kid Blue as Drummer
 1973 The Stone Killer as Mathews
 1977 Red Alert (TV movie) as Henry Stone
 1980 OHMS (TV movie) as Floyd Wing
 1980 On the Nickel as C.G.
 1980 Angel City (TV movie) as Jared Teeter
 1981 The Gentleman Bandit (TV movie) as Father Bernard Pagano
 1988 Good Old Boy: A Delta Boyhood as The Narrator
 1989 Red Earth, White Earth as Martin
 1990 Crash and Burn as Lathan Hooks
 1990 Desperate Hours
 1992 The Bodyguard as Herb Farmer
 1993 Cliffhanger as Ranger Frank
 1994 Sioux City as Drew McDermott
 1996 Homeward Bound II: Lost in San Francisco as Shadow (voice)
 2000 Timequest as The Time Traveler
 2002 Sunshine State as Furman Temple
 2003 Blessings (TV movie) as Sheriff
 2004 Silver City as Casey Lyle
 2010 Letters to God as Cornelius Perryfield
 2011 25 Hill as Ed
 2012 Gabe the Cupid Dog as R.L. Dutton

Television
 1966 Look Up and Live as Host
 1967 The Borgia Stick (TV movie) as The Man From Toledo
 1967-1968 N.Y.P.D. as Robert Stryker
 1970 Bonanza "The Lady and the Mark" as Hoby
 1971 Nichols as Sam Burton
 1972-1981 The Waltons as John Walton Sr.
 1973 The Thanksgiving Story (TV movie)
 1976 The Secret Life of John Chapman (TV movie) as John Chapman
 1977 Roots as Slater, Third Mate
 1977 Waiting for Godot (TV movie) as Pozzo
 1978 CBS: On the Air as Himself
 1980 Angel City (TV movie) as Jared Teeter
 1981 The Gentleman Bandit (TV movie) as Father Bernard Pagano
 1982 A Wedding on Walton's Mountain (TV movie) as John Walton Sr.
 1982 Mother's Day on Waltons Mountain (TV movie) as John Walton Sr.
 1982 A Day for Thanks on Walton's Mountain (TV movie) as John Walton Sr.
 1983 The Mississippi as Ben Walker Sr.
 1984 A Good Sport (TV movie) as Tommy O'Bannon
 1984 Growing Pains (TV movie) as Rob
 1985 Crime of Innocence (TV movie) as Frank Hayward
 1987 Reading Rainbow
 1989 Murder, She Wrote as District Attorney Paul Robbins
 1990 Sparks: The Price of Passion (TV movie) as Orville Lemon
 1993 A Walton Thanksgiving Reunion (TV movie) as John Walton Sr.
 1994 Time Trax as Lamont Carson
 1994 Sin & Redemption (TV movie) as Cal Simms
 1994 Keys (TV movie) as Dr. C.J. Halligan
 1995 A Season of Hope (TV movie) as Sam Hackett
 1995 A Walton Wedding (TV movie) as John Walton Sr.
 1996 Murder One as Malcolm Dietrich
 1997 Orleans as Otis Leblanc
 1997 A Walton Easter (TV movie) as John Walton Sr.
 1997 The Third Twin (TV movie) as Senator Proust
 1999 The Outer Limits as Gene Morton
 1999 Chicken Soup for the Soul as Dad
 1999 Rocket Power as Doc Freimouth (voice)
 2000 The President's Man (TV movie) as President Mathews
 2001 All My Children as Bart
 2001 Spirit (TV movie) as Jacob
 2003 Blessings (TV movie) as Sheriff
 2003-2005 Carnivàle as Reverend Norman Balthus
 2004 The Practice as Walter Josephson
 2007 Cold Case as Felton Metz
 2008 CSI "Young Man with a Horn" as Sheriff Montgomery
 2008-2013 NCIS as Jackson Gibbs (8 episodes)
 2008 The Cleaner as Jonus Mullins
 2009 Ace Ventura Jr: Pet Detective (TV movie) as Grandpa Ventura
 2011 Kickin' It as Principal Keener (7 episodes)
 2009-2014 Days of Our Lives as Father Matt (recurring) (final appearance)
 2009 Grey's Anatomy "Tainted Obligation" as Irving Waller
 2009-2013 Bones as Hank Booth (3 episodes)
 2011 Off the Map "On the Mean Streets of San Miguel" as Abuelito

As director
 1973-1980 The Waltons (TV series)
 1980 On the Nickel
 1983 The Mississippi (TV series)

As producer
 1984 A Good Sport (executive producer)

As writer
 1980 On the Nickel

Theatre
 Marathon '33 (1963)
 Blues for Mister Charlie (1964)
 Hogan's Goat (play) (1965)
 The Trial of Lee Harvey Oswald (1967)
 Other People's Money (play, before the film) (1991, Trinity Repertory Company, Providence, RI)
 The Young Man From Atlanta (1995)

References

External links
 
 
 
 Ralph Waite at the University of Wisconsin's Actors Studio audio collection
 Ralph Waite on Biography Channel

1928 births
2014 deaths
20th-century American male actors
21st-century American male actors
American Presbyterian ministers
American actor-politicians
American male film actors
American male television actors
American male voice actors
Bucknell University alumni
California Democrats
Male actors from New York (state)
Military personnel from New York (state)
People from White Plains, New York
United States Marines
Yale Divinity School alumni
The Waltons